Carlo Bergamini (F 593) was the lead ship of the Bergamini-class frigate of the Italian Navy.

Construction and career 
She was laid down on 19 July 1959 and launched on 16 June 1960 by Stabilimento Tecnico Triestino. She was commissioned on 23 June 1962.

Luigi Rizzo and Carlo Bergamini were discarded in 1980 and 1981 respectively. She was dismantled in 1983.

Gallery

References 

 Blackman, Raymond V. B. Jane's Fighting Ships 1962–63. London: Sampson Low, Marston & Company, 1962.
 Blackman, Raymond V. B. Jane's Fighting Ships 1971–72. London: Sampson Low, Marston & Company, 1971. .
 Gardiner, Robert and Stephen Chumbley. Conway's All The World's Fighting Ships 1947–1995. Annapolis, Maryland USA: Naval Institute Press, 1995. .

Ships built in Italy
1960 ships
Bergamini-class frigates